The Cuban Revolution was not only fought by armed rebels on the battlefield but also through the propaganda campaigns designed and orchestrated by Fidel Castro and his rebel comrades. Propaganda in Cuba during the revolution included Castro's use of personal interviews with journalists, radio broadcasts and publicity seeking operations that contributed significantly to the victory of the rebels over Fulgencio Batista's government and provided insight into the successful propaganda campaign established by Castro after gaining power. The limited yet successful revolutionary propaganda apparatus transitioned into what Castro has called "one of the most potent weapons in his foreign policy arsenal." Today the Cuban government maintains an intricate propaganda machine that includes a global news agency, magazines, newspapers, broadcasting facilities, publishing houses, front groups, and other miscellaneous organizations that all stem from the modest beginnings of Castro's revolutionary propaganda machine.

Revolutionary propaganda

Historical background
After Fulgencio Batista took over control of the armed forces and reestablished his power in Cuba in 1952, Fidel Castro began his battle for social justice. As a 25-year-old lawyer, he went to the Urgency Court and presented a brief outlining how Batista and his accomplices had violated six articles of the Code of Social Defense, and therefore would have to serve 106 years in prison. When the court rejected his appeal, Castro decided revolution was necessary. He recruited a group of about 200 rebels consisting mostly of students or graduates in their twenties, including his younger brother, Raúl Castro.

On July 26, 1953, the "rebel" army attacked the Moncada military barracks, which had the second largest garrison in the country. The attack, which is widely considered the triggering cause of the Cuban revolution, resulted in a tremendous defeat for Castro's group, and many of his comrades were killed. While Fidel, Raúl, and many other survivors attempted to run away after the loss was clear, they were soon captured and imprisoned. Fidel, being an educated lawyer, insisted to take on his defence himself. On October 16, 1953, he spoke in front of the court for four hours, defending the actions of himself and his rebels by claiming they saw it as their duty as Cubans to get Batista overthrown, as he was disrespecting their Constitution (established in 1940). He concluded the speech with the famous quote "Condemn me, it does not matter. History will absolve me." Fidel was eventually sentenced to 15 years in prison for leading the attack, while Raúl and most of the other rebels received 13 years. While in prison he transcribed his "History will absolve me" speech to paper so that it could be smuggled out and spread to the public as propaganda. This helped spread the word about the previously relatively unknown young rebel to the people, and he gained a large base of followers. Especially his message of socialist (although this word was not directly used) revolution for the benefit of the Cuban people, and the elimination of U.S. exploitation of the country's resources appealed to many who suffered under the Batista regime. 

After an intense public campaign for his release, Batista decided it would benefit him more to grant Fidel Castro and his comrades amnesty, which he did on May 15, 1955, after only 18 months. Shortly after, in July 1955, Castro went into exile in southeastern Mexico to gather arms and men for an invasion of Cuba. The small army boarded the Granma en route to Santiago de Cuba, where they were to meet a rebel leader on November 30, 1956. Again, the attack failed to go as planned, and Castro and his rebel army were forced to flee into the Sierra Maestra mountains. Only 12 made it into the mountains, including Fidel and Raúl Castro, and Argentinian Ernesto "Che" Guevara, whom the Castro brothers met and teamed up with in Mexico. From atop the Sierra Maestra, the rebels sought to gain domestic support for the revolution while winning over the international community (most notably the United States).

Components
The most important aspects of the revolutionary propaganda campaign included the use of broadcasts on Radio Rebelde (Rebel Radio), personal interviews with journalists such as Herbert L. Matthews from The New York Times, and publicity-seeking operations such as the kidnapping of Argentine race car driver Juan Manuel Fangio. Utilizing these means contributed to the overwhelming political victory of Fidel Castro and his revolutionary supporters in garnering domestic support and international acclaim.

Personal interviews
The most notable and influential interviews were done by New York Times journalist Herbert L. Matthews. Matthews went to the Sierra Maestra upon invitation by Castro in February 1957, and wrote three articles for the Times appearing on the 24th, 25th and 26th of the same month, with the first two appearing on page one. The articles spread the word that Castro's revolution was still very much alive, which was important since many people actually thought the commander had died already. Matthews deliberately chose words to create a positive impression of him to the American people, for example stating that Castro's program was "radical, democratic, and therefore anti-Communist."

Radio Rebelde

Radio Rebelde was part of the second phase of Castro's and the rebels' propaganda campaign. Che Guevara set up a shortwave radio in the Sierra Maestra headquarters. The shortwave bypassed eastern Cuba while reaching places like Venezuela. Soon countries such as Costa Rica, Colombia, Ecuador and Argentina were involved in the retransmission of the rebels' message. By 1968, Radio Rebelde reached as far as Washington, D.C. and throughout the Caribbean Basin. The 150-watt broadcast put the Batista regime on the defensive and promoted the heroic impression of Castro abroad.

Publicity operations
Radio Rebelde and the Times articles contributed to international interest in the Cuban Revolution, which Castro exploited at his full advantage. Castro granted other prominent news outlets the same personal interviews he gave Matthews. Argentina sent reporter Jorge Ricardo Masetti to interview Castro in 1958. He wrote the book Those Who Fight and Those Who Weep about his experience in Cuba and later returned to Cuba to head Castro's international press agency. In addition to interviews, the rebels undertook paramilitary operations designed to gain international attention and promote the ineffectiveness of Batista's security forces. The urban rebel force kidnapped famous race car driver Juan Manuel Fangio from a Havana hotel in broad daylight. Upon his release, Fangio spoke of the humane treatment he had received. Later the rebels would kidnap a busload of American sailors and marines in order to pressure Batista to stop indiscriminate bombing of rebel villages. The idea was to get the United States to perceive the Batista regime as ineffective and savage. The propaganda campaign ultimately swayed the United States to halt all arms shipments to Batista in March 1958.

Post-revolutionary propaganda

Structure
During the revolution, Fidel Castro created a propaganda structure that would serve as the foundation for propaganda dissemination after gaining power. He immediately began organizing an international media empire that included radio stations, a news agency with offices around the world, newspapers, magazines, publishing houses, "friendship" institutes and other organizations that were under direct control of the Cuban Communist Party's Political Bureau. Castro was so entrenched in the daily nuances of the propaganda apparatus that he would personally visit editorial offices to check on stories in the party's daily newspaper Granma or visit the headquarters of Cuba's international news agency Prensa Latina to make statements on breaking news. Castro also wrote editorials on sensitive subject matter most often concerning the United States. The day-to-day components of the media empire were given to Antonio Perez Herrero, who became head of the Revolutionary Orientation Department which outlined ideological guidelines of the party and made sure they were followed.  Herrero and Department Chief Orlando Fundora Lopez often accompanied Castro abroad to ensure that tight control on the media was not loosened by distance.

Components

Granma

Granma was set up to give Cubans a daily newspaper with international and domestic news stories while giving the Castro regime an internal propaganda outlet.  Along with the daily domestic distribution, Granma also publishes the Granma Weekly Review in English, French and Spanish for international distribution. The daily edition is only published in Spanish. Daily readers of Granma learned early on that the Castro regime supported the Sandinistas in Nicaragua and rebels fighting president Jose Napoleon Duarte in El Salvador. Granma readers were indoctrinated with rampant anti-American propaganda: they were also aware of the regime's hatred for Israel, capitalism, and almost all things Western. Readers never encountered stories of political executions, cultural repressions, the tortures, disappearing and jailing of anti-Castro dissidents, the poor Cuban economy, and the dependence of Cuba on the Soviet Union.  

There was also no mention of the more than one million Cubans living in America. Recurring messages of Granma include the idea that the United States and all capitalist countries are greedy Nazi-like societies, that Cuba and all the revolutionary and socialists supporters are societies of moral and progressive citizens, and that because of the existence of good and evil nations, Marxist–Leninist revolutions must happen all over the globe.

Prensa Latina
One of the most important parts of the propaganda apparatus is Prensa Latina, which not only disseminates Castro's propaganda worldwide, but also works as a front for intelligence collection and operations. The idea for Prensa Latina was conceived in 1959 during Operation Truth when Fidel Castro gathered hundreds of journalists, mostly from Latin America, in Cuba to discuss what he called a conspiracy by European and American press. While condemning the Western press he told reporters, "The Latin American press ought to have the means that would permit it to know the truth and not be victim of the lie." Copies of Prensa Latina in English were sent to Egypt and Yugoslavia, while Spanish copies were directed at Czechoslovakia and Poland. A year after it was created, Prensa Latina had offices in Washington, New York, London, Paris, Geneva and Prague as well as all Latin American countries except Haiti, the Dominican Republic and Nicaragua. By 1972, it controlled two national and twelve international radio circuits, and by 1975, it distributed news materials in Quechua, a native Indian language used in Ecuador, Peru and Bolivia.Prensa Latina also publishes extensive material on economic matters.

International radio broadcast
Before Castro, Cuba had no international shortwave radio broadcast, but in 1961 Radio Havana was created. Radio Havana is broadcast in eight languages to countries in Europe, the Mediterranean, Africa and the Americas. The use of Radio Moscow's transmitters allowed broadcast programs to reach Europe and the Mediterranean. Radio Havana's shortwave broadcasts are supplemented by medium wave broadcasts from La Voz de Cuba. An English version called the Voice of Cuba transmits in medium wave to North America. The regime also has a history of supporting subversive broadcasting efforts. Some of the most important and influential in Latin America include assisting Salvadoran insurgents with Radio Venceremos and Radio Farabundo Marti.

Cuban Institute for Friendship Among People (ICAP)
The ICAP was established on December 30, 1960, to gain popular support in Europe and the United States in anticipation of a counterrevolutionary invasion by the United States.  ICAP organized foreigners into associations based on their country of origin such as the Union of Peruvians in Cuba, the Cuban-Spanish Friendship Society, the Cuban-Venezuelan Institute of Revolutionary Solidarity and the Association of Guatemalans Residing in Cuba. The president of ICAP at the time, Rene Rodriguez Cruz, admitted that the friendship organizations sponsored by ICAP were used for Havana's propaganda purposes. About 113 friendship organizations existed globally at the time. Members of the organization would hand out pro-Castro pamphlets, participate in marches and demonstrations, and recruit foreign groups to come to Cuba. ICAP continues to host conferences and other events in Cuba catered to foreign delegations and Cuban solidarity networks.

Casa de las Américas

Casa de las Américas was established in April 1959 as a place where Castro could harness the propagandistic power of Latin American intellectuals. In 1960, it organized a literary contest that awarded prizes to Latin American poets, authors and playwrights. Also in 1960, it published a literary journal of the same name for poets and writers that provided a platform for political slant pieces. In addition to publishing winners of the literary contest, Casa published book-length material deemed important enough for widespread distribution. Perhaps the most important and influential piece published was Régis Debray's Revolution within the Revolution? in 1967. This book meant to complement Che Guevara's Bolivian uprising.

Performing arts
Any avenue of performing arts was used to portray Cuban society in a favorable way. The Cuban National Ballet headed by prima ballerina Alicia Alonso is the flagship example of the propaganda machine. Alonso and the Ballet performed in places like Hanoi and Moscow as well as the Kennedy Center in Washington, D.C. After retiring from ballet, Alonso became the director of choreography.

Gallery

See also
Communist propaganda

References

 
Cuban Revolution
Cuba
Communist propaganda
Anti-Americanism